The 2021 African Women's Handball Championship was the 24th edition of the African Women's Handball Championship, which was originally scheduled to take place from 2 to 12 December 2020. Due to the COVID-19 pandemic, it was rescheduled to 8 to 18 June 2021 in Yaoundé, Cameroon. The tournament was held under the aegis of African Handball Confederation and acted as the African qualifying tournament for the 2021 World Women's Handball Championship.

Angola won their third straight and 14th overall title after defeating Cameroon in the final.

Venues

Draw
The draw was made on 1 April 2021.

Preliminary round
All times are local (UTC+1).

Group A

Group B

Group C

Ranking of third-placed teams

President's Cup

Knockout stage

Bracket

Fifth place bracket

Quarterfinals

5–8th place semifinals

Semifinals

Seventh place game

Fifth place game

Third place game

Final

Final standing

References

2021
2021 in women's handball
Sport in Yaoundé
International sports competitions hosted by Cameroon
June 2021 sports events in Africa
Handball events postponed due to the COVID-19 pandemic
2021 in African women's sport
Events in Yaoundé